Go Simpsonic with The Simpsons is the 1999 soundtrack album from The Simpsons.  It takes many of the musical numbers from the series which were either not included in the previous album, Songs in the Key of Springfield, or were created since the previous album's release. The album has 53 tracks, most of which were written by Alf Clausen. It was well received by critics, being named the Best Compilation Album of 1999 by Soundtrack.net, and charted at number 197 on the Billboard 200. Hollywood Records released the album on digital and streaming platforms on December 9, 2021.

Background and release
Go Simpsonic with The Simpsons is a soundtrack album that features songs that have appeared on the American animated television series The Simpsons, as well as some songs that never made the final cut. It is a sequel to the album Songs in the Key of Springfield, and the second album to feature songs from the show. The third and latest soundtrack album, The Simpsons: Testify, was released eight years after Go Simpsonic in 2007.

Most songs on the album were written by Alf Clausen, who is the composer on The Simpsons and co-writes, arranges, produces, and conducts almost all music that is featured in the show. Although the album also features covers of songs written by others. For example, a cover of "The Star-Spangled Banner" sung by the character Bleeding Gums Murphy, and a cover of Terry Cashman's "Talkin' Baseball" called "Talkin' Softball", that Cashman himself sung on the show, are included. The main theme song of The Simpsons, written by Danny Elfman, is also featured.

The album was released on the Rhino Records label on November 2, 1999, during the eleventh season of the show. It peaked at number 197 on the Billboard 200, number two on Top Kid Audio and number 14 on Top Internet Albums. The album remained on the Top Kid Audio chart for 17 weeks.

Critical reception

Go Simpsonic with The Simpsons received positive reviews from most music critics upon its release. AllMusic's Stephen Thomas Erlewine gave the album a five out of five rating, writing that "it serves as a reminder of the sheer brilliance of the music within this peerless show. Much of that musical brilliance is due to Alf Clausen [...] Hearing all of this music, ranging from the first to the ninth season, in one place confirms how Clausen and his collaborators can master everything from show tunes to commercial jingles. What's really impressive is that the music is every bit as funny, sometimes more so, than the lyrics — and that's no easy trick to pull off."

Soundtrack.net named Go Simpsonic the Best Compilation Album of 1999. The creator of that website, David A. Koran, said the album features some of his all-time favorites from the show, including the song "Canyonero". He also wrote that "one of Alf Clausen's other great talents besides working well along great lyricists is his ability to parody without sounding like an exact knock-off. In 'The Simpsons Spin-Off Showcase' medley, the 'Chief Wiggum, P.I' cue was great invention in the style of Jan Hammer's original orchestrations for Miami Vice." Koran also praised the "Scorpio" and "McBain" songs for their similarities with John Barry's James Bond tunes. Similarly, Elysa Gardner of Los Angeles Times commended the parodic nature of many songs on the album. She wrote that "this showcases the brilliant work of series composer Alf Clausen and his delightful knack of spoofing various musical forms. Included are sendups of musicals, movies (Mary Poppins and Bond themes) and commercials, each lovingly and lethally delivered. There are 53 cuts in all, and most of them, like the show itself, stand up to repeated listenings. A treasure."

Alan Sepinwall of The Star-Ledger was more critical, writing that "Unfortunately, Songs in the Key [...] used up most of the show's best musical inventory, leaving only assorted scraps for Go Simpsonic. There are some wonderful tunes, including the 'Mary Poppins'-ish 'Cut Every Corner,' Bart and Sideshow Bob performing the score to 'HMS Pinafore,' the SUV parody commercial 'Canyonero,' and Homer and Marge's take on the All in the Family theme [...], but too much of it is filler."

Track listing

Charts

References

1999 soundtrack albums
The Simpsons soundtrack albums
Rhino Records soundtracks
Rhino Records compilation albums
Albums with cover art by Matt Groening
Hollywood Records soundtracks
Hollywood Records compilation albums